Xyleborinus is a genus of typical bark beetles in the family Curculionidae. There are more than 80 described species in Xyleborinus.

Species
These 89 species belong to the genus Xyleborinus:

 Xyleborinus aduncus Wood & Bright, 1992
 Xyleborinus aemulus Wood & Bright, 1992
 Xyleborinus alienus Wood & Bright, 1992
 Xyleborinus alni Niijima, 1909
 Xyleborinus andrewesi Wood & Bright, 1992
 Xyleborinus angustior Hulcr, Dole, Beaver & Cognato, 2007
 Xyleborinus ankius Wood & Bright, 1992
 Xyleborinus armatus Wood & Bright, 1992
 Xyleborinus artelineatus Wood & Bright, 1992
 Xyleborinus artestriatus Wood & Bright, 1992
 Xyleborinus aspericauda (Eggers, 1941)
 Xyleborinus attenuatus Wood & Bright, 1992
 Xyleborinus beaveri Beaver & Browne (Browne in), 1978
 Xyleborinus bicornatulus Wood & Bright, 1992
 Xyleborinus buscki Bright, 1981c
 Xyleborinus celatus Wood, 1974a
 Xyleborinus cocoensis Kirkendall & Jordal, 2006
 Xyleborinus collarti Wood & Bright, 1992
 Xyleborinus cuneidentis Wood & Bright, 1992
 Xyleborinus cuneolosus Wood & Bright, 1992
 Xyleborinus cupulatus Wood & Bright, 1992
 Xyleborinus dentellus Wood & Bright, 1992
 Xyleborinus diapiformis Wood & Bright, 1992
 Xyleborinus dirus Wood, 1974a
 Xyleborinus diversus Wood & Bright, 1992
 Xyleborinus excavatus Wood & Bright, 1992
 Xyleborinus exiguus Walker
 Xyleborinus forcipatus Wood & Bright, 1992
 Xyleborinus forficuloides Wood & Bright, 1992
 Xyleborinus forficulus Wood & Bright, 1992
 Xyleborinus gracilicornis Wood & Bright, 1992
 Xyleborinus gracilipennis Wood & Bright, 1992
 Xyleborinus gracilis Wood & Bright, 1992
 Xyleborinus heveae Wood & Bright, 1992
 Xyleborinus horridulus Bright & Skidmore, 1997
 Xyleborinus insulosus Bright & Torres, 2006
 Xyleborinus intersetosus Wood & Bright, 1992
 Xyleborinus librocedri Swaine & J.M., 1934
 Xyleborinus linearicollis Wood & Bright, 1992
 Xyleborinus longulus Bright, 1985c
 Xyleborinus longus Wood & Bright, 1992
 Xyleborinus marcidus Wood & Bright, 1992
 Xyleborinus micrographus Wood & Bright, 1992
 Xyleborinus mimosae Wood & Bright, 1992
 Xyleborinus mitosomiformis Wood & Bright, 1992
 Xyleborinus mitosomipennis Wood & Bright, 1992
 Xyleborinus namibiae Wood & Bright, 1992
 Xyleborinus octiesdentatus (Murayama, 1931: 46)
 Xyleborinus octospinosus Wood & Bright, 1992
 Xyleborinus opimulus Wood & Bright, 1992
 Xyleborinus percuneolus Wood & Bright, 1992
 Xyleborinus perexiguus Wood & Bright, 1992
 Xyleborinus perminutissimus Wood & Bright, 1992
 Xyleborinus perpusillus Wood & Bright, 1992
 Xyleborinus pilosellus Wood & Bright, 1992
 Xyleborinus polyalthiae Wood & Bright, 1992
 Xyleborinus pometianus Wood & Bright, 1992
 Xyleborinus protinus Wood & Bright, 1992
 Xyleborinus pseudopityogenes Wood & Bright, 1992
 Xyleborinus quadrispinis Wood & Bright, 1992
 Xyleborinus quadrispinosus Wood & Bright, 1992
 Xyleborinus reconditus Wood & Bright, 1992
 Xyleborinus saginatus Wood, 2007
 Xyleborinus saxeseni (Ratzeburg, 1837) (fruit-tree pinhole borer)
 Xyleborinus schaufussi Wood & Bright, 1992
 Xyleborinus schoenherri Wood & Bright, 1992
 Xyleborinus sclerocaryae Wood & Bright, 1992
 Xyleborinus sculptilis Wood & Bright, 1992
 Xyleborinus sentosus Wood & Bright, 1992
 Xyleborinus sharpae Wood & Bright, 1992
 Xyleborinus signatipennis Wood & Bright, 1992
 Xyleborinus similans Wood & Bright, 1992
 Xyleborinus speciosus Wood & Bright, 1992
 Xyleborinus spiculatulus Wood & Bright, 1992
 Xyleborinus spiculatus Wood & Bright, 1992
 Xyleborinus spinifer Wood & Bright, 1992
 Xyleborinus spiniger Wood & Bright, 1992
 Xyleborinus spinipennis Wood & Bright, 1992
 Xyleborinus spinipes Wood & Bright, 1992
 Xyleborinus spiniposticus Wood, 1992a
 Xyleborinus spinosus Wood & Bright, 1992
 Xyleborinus subgranulatus Eggers, 1930
 Xyleborinus subsulcatus Wood & Bright, 1992
 Xyleborinus syzygii Wood & Bright, 1992
 Xyleborinus tribuloides Wood, 1977b
 Xyleborinus tribulosus Wood, 1974a
 Xyleborinus truncatipennis Wood & Bright, 1992
 Xyleborinus tsugae Swaine & J.M., 1934
 Xyleborinus undatus Wood & Bright, 1992

References

Further reading

External links

 

Scolytinae
Beetle genera
Taxa named by Edmund Reitter
Articles created by Qbugbot